Tertiary is a term used in organic chemistry to classify various types of compounds (e. g. alcohols, alkyl halides, amines) or reactive intermediates (e. g. alkyl radicals, carbocations).

See also 
 Primary (chemistry)
 Secondary (chemistry)
 Quaternary (chemistry)

References 

Chemical nomenclature